Parapolycesta cobosi is a species of beetle in the family Buprestidae, the only species in the genus Parapolycesta.

References

Buprestidae genera